The MICOR Leader 50 is a heavy semi-automatic sniper rifle of US origin. The weapon has a bullpup layout.

See also
List of bullpup firearms
List of sniper rifles
Anti-materiel rifle
Raufoss Mk211
Barrett XM500

References

Sniper rifles of the United States
.50 BMG sniper rifles
Bullpup rifles
Semi-automatic rifles